Sneakin' Around is a collaborative album by American guitarists Chet Atkins and Jerry Reed, released in 1991. Reed and Atkins had done a series of recording collaborations nearly 20 years before this release. It peaked at No. 68 on the Billboard Country Albums charts.

At the Grammy Awards of 1993, Sneakin' Around won the Grammy Award for Best Country Instrumental Performance. Chet was also nominated that year for his work with The Chieftains' "Tahitian Skies".

Reception

Allmusic music critic Richard S. Ginell called the album a "most welcome" encore and wrote; "the old Atkins/Reed country ways filter in, the rapport and good humor between the two intact and bubbling..."

Track listing
 "Summertime" (George Gershwin, Ira Gershwin, DuBose Heyward)
 "Cajun Stripper" (Doug Kershaw / Rusty Kershaw)
 "Vaudville Daze" (Chet Atkins / Jerry Reed)
 "Here We Are" (Chet Atkins / Billy Edd Wheeler)
 "The Claw" (Jerry Reed)
 "First Born" (Jerry Reed)
 "Major Attempt at a Minor Thing" (Jerry Reed)
 "Gibson Girl" (Wayne Simmons)
 "Sneakin' Around" (R. L. Kass)
 "Nifty Fifties" (Rocky Stone)
 "Here Comes That Girl" (Chet Atkins / Darryl Dybka)

Personnel
Chet Atkins - guitar
Jerry Reed - guitar
David Hungate - bass
Mark O'Connor - fiddle
Mark Knopfler - guitar
Suzy Bogguss - background vocals on "Nifty Fifties"
Amy Grant - background vocals on "Nifty Fifties"
Paul Yandell - guitar
Darryl Dybka - keyboards
Pat Bergeson – guitar
Johnny Gimble – fiddle
Terry McMillan – harmonica, percussion
Larrie Londin – drums, percussion
Gary Chapman – background vocals
Vicki Hampton – background vocals

Chart performance

References

1991 albums
Chet Atkins albums
Jerry Reed albums
Albums produced by Chet Atkins
Columbia Records albums